Qeshlaq-e Badeyr (also Romanized as Qeshlāq-e Badeyr) is a village in Anjirlu Rural District, in the Central District of Bileh Savar County, Ardabil Province, Iran. At the 2006 census, its population was 17, in 6 families.

References 

Towns and villages in Bileh Savar County